is a railroad tunnel in Shizuoka Prefecture, Japan operated by JR Central’s Tōkaidō Main Line. This 7.8 km long tunnel shortened the trunk route between Tokyo and Kobe by omitting a detour round the mountains between Atami and Numazu.

History
The initial routing of the Tōkaidō Main Line railway connecting Tokyo with Osaka avoided the Hakone mountains between Shizuoka and Kanagawa Prefectures by a long loop north to Gotemba and then south to Numazu. This is the line now called the Gotemba Line and the same routing followed by the Tōmei Expressway vehicular highway to this day.

Recognizing that this loop through Gotemba was a major bottleneck in the rail system, the Japanese Railroad Ministry issued a contract in 1918 to the Kajima Corporation to build a tunnel. The project was heralded as a major public works endeavor that would boost the Japanese economy out of its post-World War I economic recession.

However, construction of the 7,804-meter tunnel proved to be extremely difficult due to numerous unforeseen problems with the local geology and contemporary tunneling technology. The Hakone mountain range is an active volcanic zone, containing a number of faults, and is subject to frequent earthquakes. In addition, workers encountered problems with a huge volume of water seepage, soft rock formations, and vents of hot spring water. On April 1, 1920, a large section of the tunnel from the Atami side collapsed, trapping 42 workers, 17 of whom were rescued a week later after heroic efforts to dig them out. The tunnel was also damaged during the Great Kantō earthquake without fatalities. Another section collapsed during an earthquake on February 26, 1930, killing five more workers. The work took many years more than initially anticipated, and costs far exceeded original budgetary estimates. The total number of workers killed during construction was 67 men.

The two ends of the tunnel were joined on June 19, 1933 and the Tanna Tunnel was opened to rail traffic on March 10, 1934. It was the second longest tunnel in Japan at the time of its completion, having been surpassed by the Shimizu Tunnel before it was completed.

The story of the construction of the Tanna Tunnel was the subject of a stage play by Hideji Hōjō in 1942.

The Tanna Tunnel remains in operation on the Tōkaidō Main Line to this day. Traffic on the Tōkaidō Shinkansen uses the parallel Shin-Tanna Tunnel (7,950m) completed in 1963.

References

External links

Kajima Corporation home page
Japan’s Railway History

Railway tunnels in Japan
Rail transport in Shizuoka Prefecture
Tunnels completed in 1934
1934 establishments in Japan